George Farmer III (born December 5, 1958) is a former professional American football wide receiver. He played four seasons in the National Football League (NFL) for the Los Angeles Rams (1982–1984) and the Miami Dolphins (1987). Farmer is the father of former USC wide receiver George Farmer.

References

1958 births
Living people
American football wide receivers
Los Angeles Rams players
Miami Dolphins players
Santa Monica Corsairs football players
Southern Jaguars football players
Players of American football from Los Angeles
National Football League replacement players